Duan Aojuan (born December 28, 2000) is a Chinese singer. She became a member of Rocket Girls 101 after finishing fourth in the survival show Produce 101.

Early life
Born on 28 December 2000, Duan graduated from Chengdu No. 44 High School.

Career

2018-present: Produce 101 and debut with Rocket Girls 101

In 2018, Duan participated in the Chinese reality survival girl group show Produce 101 China aired from April 21 to June 23 on Tencent Video. Duan was eventually placed 4th overall in the final episode and debuted as a member of Rocket Girls 101 on 23 June as the main vocalist. She has made several notable soundtrack appearances for films such as "幸福的時光" in The Island, "毒液前來" for promotion of Venom and "福气拱拱来" in Boonie Bears: Blast into the Past.

Discography

Soundtrack appearances

Filmography

Television shows

Drama

Notes

References

External links

 

2000 births
Living people
People from Chengdu
Singers from Chengdu
Rocket Girls 101 members
C-pop singers
Produce 101 (Chinese TV series) contestants